Milan Rathnayake (born 1 August 1996) is a Sri Lankan cricketer. He made his List A debut for Tincomalee District in the 2016–17 Districts One Day Tournament on 19 March 2017. He made his Twenty20 debut for Sri Lanka Air Force Sports Club in the 2017–18 SLC Twenty20 Tournament on 24 February 2018.

International career
In February 2023, Rathnayake was selected Sri Lanka's Test squad for their series against New Zealand.

References

External links
 

1996 births
Living people
Sri Lankan cricketers
Tincomalee District cricketers
Sri Lanka Air Force Sports Club cricketers
Sportspeople from Kurunegala